General Sir Henry Murray  (6 August 1784 – 29 July 1860) was a British Army officer who fought in the Napoleonic Wars. As the younger son of an earl, he is sometimes styled "the Honourable".

Biography
Murray, born 6 August 1784, was the fourth son of David Murray, 2nd Earl of Mansfield, and his second wife, Louisa, daughter of Charles Cathcart, 9th Lord Cathcart.

Murray was commissioned a cornet in the 16th Dragoons on 16 May 1800 and a second lieutenant on 11 June 1801. On 26 June 1801 he was promoted to first lieutenant in the 10th Dragoons, and a captain on 24 August 1802. He was a captain in the 20th Dragoons from 5 November 1802.

Between 1805 and 1807 he served as aide-de-camp for his uncle Lord Cathcart in Ireland and Egypt then as a major in the 26th Cameronians during the Walcheren Campaign (1809) and its siege of Flushing. Having joined the 26th on 26March 1807 he remained with them for three years. On 2August 1810 he joined the 18th Hussars as a major. He remained with the 18th Dragoons until the end of the Napoleonic Wars, being promoted to Lieutenant-Colonel of the Regiment on 2 January 1812. During a crossing of the Esla River while with the 18th Hussars, his horse fell severely injuring him after which he spent some time in the hospital at Palencia. He was present at the Battle of Morales (2 June 1813), despite still suffering from the severe wound to his knee.

He took part in the Battle of Quatre Bras (16 June 1815) before leading the retreat the following day. At the Battle of Waterloo (18 June 1815) he led the 18th Hussars as part of Sir Hussey Vivian's charge at the conclusion of the battle.

He became General Officer Commanding Western District in 1842. During the latter part of his life, Murray resided at Wimbledon Lodge and died there on 29July 1860. There is a memorial to him in St Mary's Church, Wimbledon and a further copy in the Garrison Church of the Royal Citadel, Plymouth.

Family
On 28June 1810 Murray married Emily, daughter of Gerard de Vismé, and had children. Their son, Arthur Stormont Murray of the Rifle Brigade was killed at the age of 28 in August 1848 at the head of a company fighting the Boers at Bloem Platts in the Cape of Good Hope.

Notes

References

 

Attribution

Further reading
 — contains a "photogravure of Murray as a 28-year-old is from a pencil drawing by Cosway made when he was a Lieutenant-Colonel commanding the 18th Hussars." 

1784 births
1860 deaths
16th The Queen's Lancers officers
10th Royal Hussars officers
20th Hussars officers
18th Royal Hussars officers
British Army generals
British Army personnel of the Napoleonic Wars
Knights Commander of the Order of the Bath
Younger sons of earls